William Herschel Bobo (January 16, 1896 – February 18, 1975) was a minor league baseball player and an American football, basketball, and baseball coach. He served as the head football coach at Mississippi State Teachers College—now known as the University of Southern Mississippi—from 1924 to 1927, compiling a record of 9–17–4. Bobo was also the head basketball coach at Mississippi State Teachers from 1924 to 1928, tallying a mark of 31–17–1, and the school's head baseball from 1925 to 1928, amassing a record of 19–10–1.

Bobo was a native of Clarksdale, Mississippi.  He died on February 18, 1975, at St. Dominic Hospital in Jackson, Mississippi.

Head coaching record

Football

References

External links
 

1896 births
1975 deaths
American football quarterbacks
Baseball third basemen
Basketball coaches from Mississippi
Clarksdale Cubs players
El Dorado Lions players
Fort Smith Giants players
Hattiesburg Hubman players
Jackson Senators players
Memphis Chickasaws players
Mississippi State Bulldogs football players
Paducah Indians players
Southern Miss Golden Eagles and Lady Eagles athletic directors
Southern Miss Golden Eagles baseball coaches
Southern Miss Golden Eagles basketball coaches
Southern Miss Golden Eagles football coaches
People from Tunica County, Mississippi
Sportspeople from Clarksdale, Mississippi
Players of American football from Mississippi
Baseball players from Mississippi